Truth Is is the second studio album by American singer Sabrina Claudio. It was released on October 4, 2019, by SC Entertainment. It follows up Claudio's 2018 album No Rain, No Flowers.

Background and singles
On June 21, 2019, "As Long As You're Asleep" was released as the lead single of the album. Claudio herself described the track as "one of my favs ever" and that she was "taking it back" to her roots with this song. The album's second single "Holding the Gun" was released on July 31, 2019 and was met favorable reviews. Jael Goldfine of Paper praised Claudio's performance on the song, saying that it "hinges on her angelic, liquid velvet voice, which stretches out across atmospheric strings and a syrupy pulsating beat". With the track, Claudio "wanted to make sure that showing violence was not a factor within the visual as violence, conceptually, isn’t what the song is about" and that it instead "represents the lengths one would go when so deeply in love". Rania Aniftos at Billboard described the song as "is a seductive R&B tune about infinite devotion". On September 19, 2019, the singer officially announced the album title and its release date. The announcement was accompanied by the release of album's title track. On the meaning of the song, Claudio elaborates that it "is about emotions we often think of but are afraid to voice – the feelings we try to convince ourselves we don't actually feel".

Promotion
To promote the album, Claudio embarks on the "Truth Is Tour" across North America and Europe with special guest Gallant.

Track listing
Track listing and credits adapted from Apple Music and Tidal.

References

2019 albums
Sabrina Claudio albums